This is a  list of totalitarian regimes. There are regimes that have been commonly referred to as "totalitarian", or the concept of totalitarianism has been applied to them, for which there is wide consensus among scholars to be called as such. Totalitarian regimes are usually distinguished from authoritarian regimes in the sense that totalitarianism represents an extreme version of authoritarianism. Authoritarianism primarily differs from totalitarianism in that social and economic institutions exist that are not under governmental control.

Table

Notes

Notes

References 

Countries by form of government
Totalitarian states